Alishewanella is a genus in the phylum Pseudomonadota (bacteria).

Etymology

The name Alishewanella derives from:Latin adjective and pronoun alius, other, another, different; New Latin feminine gender noun Shewanella, a bacterial genus name; New Latin feminine gender noun Alishewanella, the other Shewanella.

Species
The genus contains seven species, namely:
 A. aestuarii (Roh et al. 2009, Latin genitive case noun aestuarii, of a tidal flat)
 A. agri (Kim et al. 2010, Latin genitive case noun agri, of a field)
 A.  alkalitolerans (Sisinthy et al. 2018)
 A. fetalis (Fonnesbech Vogel et al, 2000,  type species of the genus, Latin noun fetus young, offspring, Latin feminine gender suff. -alis, suffix denoting pertaining to, New Latin feminine gender adjective fetalis, pertaining to the fetus, from which the organism was isolated)
 A. jeotgali (Kim et al, 2009, New Latin genitive case noun jeotgali, of jeotgal, a traditional Korean fermented seafood)
 A. solinquinati (Kolekar et al. 2014)
 A. tabrizica (Tarhriz et al. 2012)

See also
 Bacterial taxonomy
 Microbiology

References 

Bacteria genera
Alteromonadales